Dominik Nitsche (born 1990) is a professional poker player, originally from Minden, Germany but now residing in Edinburgh, Scotland.

Nitsche began playing poker online in 2006, amassing winnings exceeding $3 million. In 2009, playing in his first live poker tournament, he won a Latin American Poker Tour event in Mar del Plata, Argentina, earning $381,000. In 2012 he won his first World Series of Poker bracelet, outlasting a field of 4,620 in a $1,000 No Limit Hold'em tournament and earning $654,000. Later that same year he won a World Poker Tour title in South Africa. The next year he made the final table of the same tournament before finishing in 4th place.

In 2014 Nitsche added two WSOP bracelets. First, he won the WSOP National Championship for $352,000. He then won another $1,000 NLHE tournament, becoming at age 23 the youngest player to win 3 bracelets (Phil Ivey was 26 when he won his third). He also made the final table of the WSOP Europe Main Event in 2013, finishing in 3rd place.

At the 2017 WSOPE Nitsche won his fourth bracelet in the €111,111 High Roller for One Drop event. The prize of €3,487,463 ($4,064,000) was his largest career cash.

As of 2018, his live tournament winnings exceed $14,600,000. His 33 WSOP cashes equal $6,280,000 of those earnings.

Early years 
As a kid, Dominik Nitsche wanted to be a professional footballer. However, he realized that he was not a good fit for sports, but that he excelled at maths. 

At the age of 16, Nitsche downloaded his first poker softwares, and started playing online under his mother’s name

World Series of Poker Bracelets 

An "E" following a year denotes bracelet(s) won at the World Series of Poker Europe

Online Poker 
Online, Dominik Nitsche plays under the screen name “Bounatirou” on PokerStars and “JustLuck1337” on Full Tilt when the platform still existed. On those two accounts, he’s amassed $7.045 million in online MTT cashes.

In May 2020, he won the SCOOP (Spring Championship of Online Poker) title on PokerStars.

External links
WSOP profile
Cardplayer.com profile
Dominik Nitsche Interview (video + transcript)

Notes

German poker players
World Series of Poker bracelet winners
Living people
1990 births